Reymart Grande Gaballo (born 24 August 1996) is a Filipino professional boxer. He has held the WBC interim bantamweight title since 2020 and previously held the WBA interim bantamweight title in 2018, and challenged for the WBC bantamweight title in 2021.

Professional career

Gaballo turned professional in 2014 and won 18 consecutive fights before challenging and beating Stephon Young for the WBA interim bantamweight title.

Gaballo vs. Rodriguez 
On 19 December 2020, Gaballo fought Emmanuel Rodriguez for the vacant WBC interim bantamweight title. Rodriguez was ranked #1 by the WBC and by The Ring at bantamweight. Despite being outclassed, outboxed and outpunched by Rodriguez in a lopsided contest, the judges gave Gaballo a split-decision win, which was seen as an robbery. One judge saw Rodriguez as the clear winner, scoring it 118–110 in his favor (the correct score), while the other two judges scored it 116-112 and 115–112 in favor of Gaballo.

Gaballo vs. Donaire 
In his next bout, Gaballo challenged Nonito Donaire for his WBC bantamweight belt. Donaire started the fight strong, and then proceeded to finish Gaballo in the fourth round with a left hook to the liver from which Gaballo couldn't get up.

Professional boxing record

See also
List of bantamweight boxing champions
History of boxing in the Philippines

References

External links

Reymart Gaballo - Profile, News Archive & Current Rankings at Box.Live

1996 births
Living people
Bantamweight boxers
Super-bantamweight boxers
Sportspeople from South Cotabato
Filipino male boxers
21st-century Filipino people